The CAIC Z-10 ("helicopter-10") is a Chinese medium attack helicopter developed for the People's Liberation Army Ground Force. It is designed primarily for anti-tank warfare missions but has secondary air-to-air combat capability as well.

Initiated by chief designer Wu Ximing, the project had early Russian involvement with Kamov Design Bureau of Russia under a contract with the Chinese government, but the collaboration was abruptly stopped due to fundamental design philosophy disagreements.  The Chinese designers and their customer, the PLA General Armaments Department, preferred a lighter-weight, more agile airframe with less emphasis on armor.  The helicopter was further developed by Changhe Aircraft Industries Corporation (CAIC) and locally manufactured.

Nicknames of characters in the Chinese classic novel Water Margin have been used to name Z-10 and its light-weight counterpart Harbin Z-19: Z-10 is called Fierce Thunderbolt (Pi Li Huo, 霹雳火), the nickname of Qin Ming, while Z-19 is called Black Whirlwind (Hei Xuan Feng, 黑旋风), the nickname of Li Kui.

In September 2016, the PLA announced that all of its army aviation units had been equipped with the Z-10.

Development and history

Early exploration
In 1979, the Chinese military studied the problem of countering large armour formations. It concluded that the best conventional solution was to use attack helicopters. Eight Aérospatiale Gazelle armed with Euromissile HOT were procured for evaluation.

By the mid-1980s, the Chinese decided a dedicated attack helicopter was required. At the time, they used civilian helicopters converted for the military; these were no longer adequate in the attack role, and suitable only as scouts. Following this, China evaluated the Agusta A129 Mangusta, and in 1988 secured an agreement with the United States to purchase AH-1 Cobras and a license to produce BGM-71 TOW missiles; the latter was cancelled following the Tiananmen Square protests of 1989 and the resulting arms embargo. The colour revolutions  prevented the purchase of attack helicopters from Eastern Europe in 1990 and 1991; Bulgaria and Russia rejected Chinese offers to purchase the Mil Mi-24.

While attempting to import foreign designs failed, war games determined that attack helicopters had to be commanded by the army, rather than the air force. This led to the formation of the People's Liberation Army Ground Force Air Force (PLAGFAF), with an initial strength of 9 Harbin Z-9. The PLAGFAF conducted tactical experiments that would help define the future Z-10's requirements. Research also decided that anti-tank missiles like the BGM-71 TOW were inadequate, and favoured an analogue to the AGM-114 Hellfire. These findings ensured the Z-10 would be based around the new missile.

Medium helicopter program
The Gulf War highlighted the urgent need for attack helicopters, and revalidated the assessment that a purpose-built design was needed. (At the time, the Chinese military depended on armed utility helicopters such as the Changhe Z-11 and Harbin Z-9.) Also, it demonstrated that the new attack helicopter would need to be able to defend itself against other helicopters and aircraft. The military perceived that once the new attack helicopter entered service, the existing helicopters would be used as scouts.

The Attack Helicopter Developmental Work Team (武装直升机开发工作小组) was formed to develop a new medium helicopter design, as opposed to basing the new design on the light helicopters then in service. The 602nd and 608th Research Institutes  started development of the 6-ton class China Medium Helicopter (CHM) program in 1994.
A secret contract was signed with the Kamov design bureau of Russia to design and verify the helicopter airframe and propulsion.

The program was promoted as a civilian project, and was able to secure significant Western technical assistance, such as from Eurocopter (rotor installation design consultancy), Pratt & Whitney Canada (PT6C turboshaft engine) and Agusta Westland (transmission). The Chinese concentrated on areas where it could not obtain foreign help.

Attack helicopter program
Pratt & Whitney alongside Hamilton Sundstrand divisions of the United Technologies Corporation unlawfully transported and provided US military technology into this program. In effort to maintain profits they conspired to cover up these facts.  They were found guilty of these charges in June 2012.  Several of the charges were deferred adjudications.

In 1998, the 602nd Research Institute proposed to either separate the armed helicopter program from the medium helicopter program, or devote all resources to the armed helicopter program. The 602nd Research Institute's called its proposed armed helicopter design the Z-10. As a result, most of the resource went to the Z-10, although the medium helicopter program continued with reduced priority; the medium helicopter could continue to develop technology used by both military and civilian aircraft.

The Z-10 program was called the Special Armed Project (专武工程), a short form for Special Use Armed Helicopter Project (专用武装直升机工程). Development was kept under stricter secrecy than the Chengdu J-10 fighter. Nearly ¥ 4 billion was initially invested and the Z-10 became one of the most important programs begun in the 9th 5-yr plan.

Publicly the 602nd Research Institute was assigned as the chief designer to promote the illusion of it being a domestically developed attack helicopter, while Harbin Aircraft Manufacturing Corporation (HAMC) of China Aviation Industry Corporation II (AVIC II) was assigned as the primary manufacturer. Nearly four dozen other establishments participated in the program. In the summer of 1999, AVIC II began to use a CAMC Z-8 to test newly developed Z-10 sub-systems. In autumn of the same year, a Harbin Z-9 was added to the test aircraft inventory. These tests concentrated on sub-systems such as the fire-control systems, HOTAS controls and navigation systems.

South Africa provided limited help in the area of flight stability based on experience from designing the Denel Rooivalk. South African assistance ceased in 2001.

New manufacturer
In 2000, the Chinese again attempted to obtain a Russian attack helicopter, but the deal for the Kamov Ka-50 fell apart just as the Mil Mi-28 deal several years earlier. The repeated failures in obtaining foreign attack helicopters reinforced feelings that China had no choice but to ignore foreign options and develop its own such aircraft and work on the Z-10 accelerated. In the same year, HAMC transferred most of its production responsibilities to CAIC of AVIC II.

The official reason given was excessive workload; HAMC was busy producing the HC120 and Harbin Z-9, as well as other fixed-wing aircraft such as the Harbin Y-12, and thus was stretched to the limit. However, many speculated that HAMC was not performing well enough due to rigid and ineffective Soviet-style management practices, believed to have caused the company to go into debt.

Although HAMC was in the process of reform, which finally succeeded, the government and military were weary and impatient. The SH-5 factory had become very profitable after its successful restructuring and reform, but it had to get out of the aircraft manufacturing business for good, manufacturing pressurized tanks and other specialized containers. It was decided that the Z-10 program was too important to be run by HAMC, so a more stable contractor was sought and CAIC was selected. HAMC still retained responsibility for production of certain sub-systems and components, for which it could utilize experience gained from manufacturing parts for foreign helicopters and fixed-wing aircraft such as the Embraer ERJ 145 family.

In May 2002, the Z-10 tail rotor and some other components were tested on the ground by the 602nd Research Institute. In April 2003, a Z-10 prototype completed its maiden flight at Lumeng (吕蒙) airfield, the airfield having been assigned to CAIC for such use. According to Chinese sources, the initial test flights were concluded on December 17, 2003, whereas according to other sources they were completed nine months earlier in March 2003. According to Jane's Information Group, a total of 3 prototypes had completed over 400 hours of test flights by this time.

By 2004 3 more prototypes were built, for a total of 6, and a second stage of test flights were concluded on December 15, 2004. In one of the test flights the future commander-in-chief of the People's Liberation Army Ground Force Air Force (PLAGAF), Song Xiangsheng (宋湘生), was on board the prototype. A third stage of intensive test flights followed, taking place during both day and night. By January 2006 weaponry and sensor tests, including firing of live ammunition, were taking place.

Prototypes and a small number of pre-production aircraft are in service with the Chinese military for evaluation. The design is undergoing continuous minor modification and upgrade based on the feedback.

Amphibious role
In March 2014, the PLA released pictures of a Z-10 helicopter conducting deck trials with a People's Liberation Army Navy Type 072A-class landing ship. The purpose may be to qualify the helicopter on ships to provide air support for landing parties launched from the ship. Type 072A-class ships have a helipad but no hangar or support facilities for the aircraft on board. The Z-10 may also be qualified on the larger Type 071 amphibious transport dock.

Design

The Kamov design bureau was contracted to perform the development work under a secret contract. Kamov worked with the Chinese to establish base specifications, such as weight, speed and payload capacity after which they had full freedom to design the helicopter. Kamov designed, tested and verified an early stage of helicopter design, after which it was provided to the Chinese team and substantially modified. Although the earliest stage of the design was made in Russia, the prototype construction, flight testing and further development was performed by the Chinese.

Flight instrumentation 
There are two configurations of the flight instrumentation for Z-10, one developed from similar foreign system (rumored to be French), and the other one is indigenously developed, and both configurations share the same holographic head-up display.  The difference in layout between the two configurations is that in one configuration, there are three color LCD multi-function displays (MFD), while in the other, these are replaced by two larger LCD MFDs.  It's not clear which one is originated from foreign system and which is indigenously developed, but it's reported that the practice of having different configurations thanks to the modular design is for export purposes, to fit the potential customer countries’ pilots’ habits. However, in early 2018, it is revealed that the 2-piece MFD version is the one selected to enter service.

Mission-related avionics

Electro-optics
One of the two primary fire control systems (FCS) is the electro-optical (optronics) system, which utilizes experience gained from earlier manufacturing of similar French and Israeli systems, combining the best of two, but only hardware wise.  The software is completely indigenously developed by China.  The optronics FCS is manufactured by the 218th Factory of China North Industries Group Corp, later reformed as China North Industries Group Corporation Electro-Opticals Science & Technology Ltd. (中兵光电科技股份有限公司.)

Helmet mounted targeting and night vision
In addition to the millimeter wave fire control radar and optronic FCS, the pilot of Z-10 has another FCS, the helmet mounted sight (HMS) designed by the 613th Research Institute. The HMS is standard for Z-10. The HMS is based on the earlier HMS used on Z-9W, which was first shown at the 5th Zhuhai Airshow held in 2004.  At the 7th Zhuhai Airshow held in 2008, the developer confirmed that the HMS is fully integrated into the FCS and the onboard navigational systems.

Navigational information can be displayed on the MFD, pilots can also fly Z-10 in a 'hands-on' manner, including at night using HMS-compatible night vision goggles (NVG) similar to the French TopOwl HMS used on Eurocopter Tiger. The Chinese HMS can control both the air-to-air and air-to-ground missiles, other unguided weapons, as well as providing navigational info.

Additionally, helmet mounted displays (HMDs) were developed for Z-10, similar to the Honeywell M142 Integrated Helmet and Display Sighting System (IHADSS) used on AH-64 Apache. The developer confirmed that HMD is not standard as it is incompatible with the NVGs, the two cannot be simultaneously equipped. It is unclear whether NVG is standard; however the developer has claimed that the helmet and HMS are fully compatible with NVGs. Images released by official government sources have shown that the Z-10 uses binocular-form NVGs (as well as other helicopters in Chinese service).

In late 2018, the 2nd generation Chinese HMS designed for Z-10 has been revealed, where a large single eye piece has replaced the two-piece binocular ones in the 1st generation HMS.

Cockpit
The stepped tandem cockpit houses two aviators – the gunner in the back and the pilot in the front – different from the conventional layout of most attack helicopters, confirmed by Chinese official news agency's video report.

The canopy of the cockpit is specially treated to prevent glare from the sun, and, as an additional option, a tanned version is also available for camouflage purposes, though this is not standard.  The bullet-proof glass of the canopy may be as thick as 38 millimeters, and is able to withstand direct hits from shrapnel and rounds fired from machine guns up to .50 caliber size. Additional armor plate can be fitted for improved protection.

Propulsion

Powerplant and auxiliary power unit
The operation engine for the Z-10 is the domestic WZ-9, designed by the 602nd Research Institute.  The previous claim of WZ-9 being a Chinese version of MTR390 proved to be false, because according to the publicized official Chinese governmental technical documents, VK-2500, TV3-117 and PT6 are all classified as third generation turboshaft engines, a category WZ-9 belongs to, while MTR390 is classified as a fourth generation turboshaft engine.

WZ-9 is the second least powerful engine out of the five tested for Z-10, but enjoys the advantage of no foreign built components. Furthermore, since it is 100% built in China, there are no political issues that would affect the purchase of vital parts.  WZ-9 is in full production to power the Z-10.

Specifications for WZ-9 turboshaft engine which installed in Z-10 for mass production :
Power: 930 - 957 kW
Fuel consumption: 0.311 kg/(kW·h)
Pressure ratio: > 8
Inlet temperature: 1355 degrees Celsius
Power-to-weight ratio: 5.4

The WZ-9 has been updated with a new variant, the WZ-9G with a higher thrust of 1200 kW.

Another new engine, developed by China and Turbomeca, is the WZ-16. Its maximum output power is 1500 kW, and it will be installed in the Z-10 and Z-15/EC175. After the installation of the new engines power would increase by 500 kW for Z-10. With WZ-9 turboshafts, Z-10 can carry 16 HJ-10 missiles with maximum takeoff weight, but the payload is very heavy for the Z-10 and engines and potentially risky for flying, so 8 missiles with other weapons serve as the maximum useful payload. After new WZ16 engines are installed in the Z-10, it can carry 16 of them like AH-64.

Weaponry
Due to its modular design concept, Z-10 can be armed with a wide variety of weaponry. The adaptation of Chinese GJV289A standard, the Chinese equivalent of the MIL-STD-1553B databus architecture, enables weaponry of both Soviet and western origin to be adopted by Z-10. Offensive weaponry consists of machine guns, cannons, rockets and missiles. The stub wings have two hardpoints each for a total of four, each hardpoint being able to carry up to 4 missiles for a total of up to 16.

Cannon and machine guns
Internal armament consists of a gun mount installed on the chin of the aircraft. Two stub wings provide attachment points for external ordnance or gun pods. The guns are mounted either in the chain gun form, or in the turret.  All guns on the Z-10 can be used either against ground targets or aerial targets, and can be directly aimed by pilots’ HMS.

Two types of autocannons are available for Z-10, with the most common being a 23 mm automatic chain gun indigenously developed by China. Another autocannon that can be mounted on the Z-10 is the Chinese reverse-engineered 25 mm M242 Bushmaster adopted for helicopter use. Originally mounted on the NVH-4 derivative of Type 85 AFV, the Chinese military modified the gun for aerial use.

Guided and unguided missiles

The air-to-surface missiles deployed by Z-10 include the domestic HJ-8 and AKD-10 anti-tank missiles. The AKD-10 is similar in capability to AGM-114 Hellfire and it has an anti-helicopter capability in addition to an anti-tank capability. Z-10 can also fire BA-21 long-range anti-tank missiles, which can be fired from 11 miles away, and homing onto target with data-linked millimeter wave radar.

The main air-to-air missile deployed by Z-10 is TY-90, a missile specifically designed for use by helicopters in aerial combat. TY-90 is much heavier than the MANPAD missiles usually carried by helicopters, providing better lethality and range. The Chinese FN-6 and QW series missiles can also be deployed, as with other non-Chinese MANPADs. TY-90 and MANPADs are often carried in missile racks, with a total of 4 missiles carried per hardpoint.

When using larger air-to-air missiles such as PL-9 or similar missiles such as AIM-9 Sidewinder, the total number is reduced to 2. The Z-10 fired its first air-to-air missile in mid-August 2013 during a live-fire drill and successfully intercepted low-altitude targets.

Z-10 can be armed with a wide variety of unguided rockets ranging from 20 mm to 130 mm caliber. The largest rockets tested were a type of 130 mm rocket that were carried on the hardpoints just as missiles are carried, while smaller caliber rockets were mounted in conventional rocket pods. The most frequently used rockets are those ranging from 57 mm to 90 mm and a total of 4 pods can be carried under the stub wings, one under each hardpoint. A family of guided 90 mm rackets produced by a subsidiary of Norinco, the Harbin Jiancheng Group (哈尔滨建成集团有限公司), was first revealed in the 9th Zhuhai Airshow held in November 2012, designated as Sky Arrow 90 (Tianjian 90 or Tian Jian 90,  90).

Strategic implications
In June 2012, the United States charged United Technologies and two of its subsidiaries, Pratt & Whitney Canada and Hamilton Sundstrand, of selling engine control software to China which aided in the development of the CAIC Z-10. While the Chinese defense ministry denied that China bought or used the software, Pratt & Whitney Canada and Hamilton Sundstrand agreed to pay more than $75 million to the U.S. government to settle the charges.

Orders and exports
China's Army Ground Forces have ordered of 118 with 106 delivered, and 12 more to go, as of 2018.

The Z-10 was one of the contenders to replace Pakistan's Bell AH-1F Cobra attack helicopters. Three Z-10s were acquired for trials in 2015 and rejected due to the inadequate WZ-9 engine. Contracts to acquire the AH-1Z and then the TAI/AgustaWestland T129 ATAK (which uses the American LHTEC CTS800–4A engine) fell through because of worsening relations with the United States. In January 2022, negotiations to acquire the Z-10ME were underway; the Z-10ME had been identified as a fallback option by February 2020.

Variants

Z-10 Prototype Prototype for basic tests. Not all has the same layout in that some had fenestron configuration while others had traditional tail rotor configuration, some had chin gun turret while other had chain gun; some had nose-mounted electro-optical system while others had mast-mounted electro-opical system.
Z-10H Pre-production series powered by Pratt & Whitney Canada PT6C-76 turboshaft engine.
Z-10 Standard Z-10 powered with domestic Chinese WZ-9 engine. Armored is mounted at the shoulder position of the pilot and gunner. Some upgrades are transferred from Z-10M program, including a more powerful WZ-9 engine, new data-link enabled missiles, ceramic/graphene add-on armor plates, MASWS, IRCM, and upward-facing engine exhaust nozzle.
Z-10 Upgrade Upgraded Z-10 is fitted with new engine exhaust nozzles pointing upward to reduce the helicopter's infrared signature. Additional armor plates are mounted on the engine covering and below cockpit windows. A new identification friend-or-foe (IFF) system and a new antenna for the BeiDou satellite navigation system are also added for better combined-operations.
Z-10K Simplified Z-10H powered with domestic Chinese WZ-9 engine of 930 – 950 kW range. Z-10K is modified from baseline Z-10 at the request of People's Liberation Army Air Force Airborne Corps. MASWS, IRCM, add-on armor plates, and some other subsystems were removed to save weight, and improve range and aerial performance.
Z-10M 3 samples built for Pakistan with equipment missing in Z-10K added back, powered by WZ-9C engine with maximum power around 1000 – 1100 kW. Was not selected by Pakistan after evaluation, but the design was used to upgrade Z-10 built earlier when a more powerful engine became available.
Z-10ME Upgraded variant first unveiled in 2018 with active and passive countermeasures, missile approach warning system, radar warning receiver, new engine exhaust nozzle pointed upwards to reduce infrared signature, new intake filtration systems, more powerful WZ-9G 1200 kW engine, larger ammunition magazine, appliqué graphene-based armor panels, infrared jammer, and a new IFF interrogator. top-mounted millimeter-wave fire-control radar and active laser jammer station can be mounted as per customer request.
Z-10 millimeter wave radar Equipped with Z-19's millimeter-wave radar for ground testing.

Operators

 People's Liberation Army — 180 estimated in service as of 2021.
 People's Liberation Army Ground Force — Z-10 variants
 People's Liberation Army Air Force Airborne Corps — Z-10K

Specifications (estimated)

See also

References

External links

 GlobalSecurity.org
 SinoDefence.com report
 Z-10 Attack helicopter on airrecognition.com
 WZ10 Helicopter Photo Collection and Intro

2000s Chinese attack aircraft
Changhe Z-10
Changhe aircraft
2000s Chinese helicopters
Twin-turbine helicopters
Aircraft first flown in 2003
China–Russia military relations